Nikola Čumić (born 20 November 1998) is a Serbian professional footballer who plays as a winger for Serbian SuperLiga club Vojvodina.

Club career

Sloboda Užice
After he passed all youth categories of Sloboda Užice, Čumić joined the first team for the 2014–15 season. He made his senior debut on 13 May 2015, against Mačva Šabac. During the 2015–16 Serbian First League season, Čumić made 12 appearances, and also made one appearance in Serbian Cup, against Loznica.

Metalac Gornji Milanovac
In summer 2016, Čumić moved to Serbian SuperLiga side Metalac Gornji Milanovac and signed a three-year contract with new club. He made his SuperLiga debut on 29 July 2016, replacing Walberto Caicedo in 71 minute of the match against Red Star Belgrade. Čumić noted his first appearance in starting 11 in a match against Voždovac, played on 14 August 2016.

Radnički Niš
In winter 2018, Čumić signed with a Radnički Niš.

Olympiacos
On 19 December 2019, Olympiacos officially announced the signing of Čumić for a transfer fee estimated in the region of €500,000; he would remain in his former club until the end of the 2019–20 season. On 16 September 2020, he joined Sporting de Gijón of the Spanish Segunda División on loan for one year.

On 31 August 2021, he joined Luzern on a season-long loan.

Career statistics

References

External links

1998 births
Living people
Sportspeople from Užice
Serbian footballers
Association football wingers
Serbian SuperLiga players
Serbian First League players
FK Sloboda Užice players
FK Metalac Gornji Milanovac players
FK Radnički Niš players
Olympiacos F.C. players
Sporting de Gijón players
FK Vojvodina players
Serbia under-21 international footballers
Serbian expatriate footballers
Serbian expatriate sportspeople in Spain
Expatriate footballers in Spain